Georgios Georgakis (alternate spellings: Giorgos, George, Yiorgos) (Greek: Γιώργος Γεωργάκης; born 18 March 1991 in Maroussi, Athens, Greece) is a Greek professional basketball player who last played for Aris  of the Greek Basket League. He is a 2.05 m (6 ft 8  in) tall center.

Professional career
Georgakis began his professional career with the Greek Basket League club Kavala in 2010. In 2012, he signed with Olympiacos. With Olympiacos, he won the EuroLeague championship in 2013.

In 2013, he moved to the Greek club Trikala Aries. After that, he played with the Greek clubs KAOD, Koroivos, Doxa Lefkadas, Iraklis, and Kolossos Rodou. In January 2020, Georgakis signed with Aris Thessaloniki.

National team career
With the junior national teams of Greece, Georgakis played at the following tournaments: the 2006 FIBA Europe Under-16 Championship, the 2007 FIBA Europe Under-16 Championship, the 2008 FIBA Europe Under-18 Championship, the 2009 FIBA Under-19 World Cup, the 2009 FIBA Europe Under-18 Championship, the 2010 FIBA Europe Under-20 Championship, and the 2011 FIBA Europe Under-20 Championship.

He won the gold medal at the 2008 FIBA Europe Under-18 Championship, the silver medal at the 2009 FIBA Under-19 World Cup, and the silver medal at the 2010 FIBA Europe Under-20 Championship.

References

External links
 Euroleague.net Profile
 Eurobasket.com Profile
 FIBA Profile
 Greek Basket League Profile 
 Greek Basket League Profile 
 Draftexpress.com Profile

1991 births
Living people
Aris B.C. players
Aries Trikala B.C. players
Centers (basketball)
Doxa Lefkadas B.C. players
Greek men's basketball players
Iraklis Thessaloniki B.C. players
K.A.O.D. B.C. players
Kavala B.C. players
Kolossos Rodou B.C. players
Koroivos B.C. players
Olympiacos B.C. players
Basketball players from Athens